Micrurapteryx gerasimovi is a moth of the family Gracillariidae. It is known from the Russian Far East.

The larvae feed on Melilotus suaveolens and Vicia cracca. They mine the leaves of their host plant.

References

Gracillariinae
Moths described in 1982